Christ Evangelical Church is a historic church building in Germantown, Wisconsin, United States.  It was built in 1862 and was added to the National Register of Historic Places in 1983. The building is now operated as the Christ Church Museum of Local History by the Germantown Historical Society.

References

External links
 Christ Church Museum of Local History - Germantown Historical Society

Churches completed in 1862
Churches in Washington County, Wisconsin
Gothic Revival church buildings in Wisconsin
Churches on the National Register of Historic Places in Wisconsin
Museums in Washington County, Wisconsin
History museums in Wisconsin
1862 establishments in Wisconsin
National Register of Historic Places in Washington County, Wisconsin